George Henry Tranter (11 September 1915 – 28 September 1998) was an English professional footballer who played as a centre half in the Football League for West Bromwich Albion. He later coached at Birmingham City.

Personal life 
Tranter's father George was also a footballer. After retiring from football, he became a publican.

Career statistics

References 

English Football League players
Southern Football League players
English footballers
1915 births
1998 deaths
Association football wing halves
People from Yardley
Birmingham City F.C. non-playing staff
West Bromwich Albion F.C. players
Hereford United F.C. players